National Insurance Corporation Limited, commonly referred to as National Insurance Corporation (NIC), is an insurance company in Uganda. The company is a leading provider of insurance and risk management services in the country.

Overview
NIC, one of the licensed insurance companies in the country, is a medium-sized insurance services provider in Uganda. , the company's total assets were valued at USh 108 billion (approximately US$30 million). During the year that ended December 2017, the company realized USh 1.9 billion (approximately US$520,000) in after-tax  profit. At that time, shareholders' equity was calculated at USh 38 billion (approximately US$10.5 million).

History
NIC was established by an Act of Parliament in 1964. Before 2005, all of the company was owned by the Ugandan government. In June 2005, the government divested 60 percent of its shares in NIC. These shares were acquired by Industrial and General Insurance Company Limited of Nigeria. In December 2009, the government began the process of divesting entirely from the company by floating its 40 percent shareholding on the Uganda Securities Exchange.

Subsidiaries
As December 2013, the company had the following subsidiaries:
 NIC (South Sudan) Limited - Juba, South Sudan - 100 percent shareholding
 Capital Assets Investment Limited - Kampala, Uganda - 100 percent shareholding
 Premium Trust Investment (Uganda) Limited - Kampala, Uganda - 100 percent shareholding
 NIC Trustees and Investment Limited - Kampala, Uganda - 100 percent shareholding

Ownership
Until December 2009, 60 percent of NIC was owned by a consortium called Corporate Holdings Limited. The consortium was owned jointly by Industrial and General Insurance Company Plc (IGI), a Nigerian insurance company (85 percent), and by local businessmen Patrick Bitature and Erik van Veen (15 percent). The remaining 40 percent of NIC, was owned by the government of Uganda.

On 31 December 2009, the Ugandan government started the process to list on the Uganda Securities Exchange (USE) the 161.6 million shares of NIC that it owned. That process concluded on 25 March 2010, when active trading of NIC began on the USE under the symbol NIC. As of 31 December 2017, the ownership of the company was as depicted in the table below:

Branch network
The company has branches in the following Ugandan towns: Arua, Busia, Fort Portal, Gulu, Jinja, Kapchorwa, Kasese, Lira, Mbarara, Malaba, Masaka, Masindi, and Mbale. In addition, NIC has a branch in Juba, South Sudan.

Products and services
NIC's products and services list includes the following:

Governance
The governing body of the company is the nine-member board of directors. Martin Aliker, one of the non-executive board members, is the acting chairman. The chief executive officer in acting capacity, is Elias Edu, following the promotion of Bayo Folayan, the previous managing director to Group Managing Director.

See also
 Banking in Uganda
 Economy of Uganda
 List of wealthiest people in Uganda
 List of insurance companies in Uganda

References

External links
    NIC Website
 Licensed Insurance Companies In Uganda
  NIC To Get UGX:8.4 Billion (US$3.3 Million) From Rights Issue In 2013
 Uganda's NIC Seeks Approval To Cross-List Shares

Financial services companies established in 1964
1964 establishments in Uganda
Insurance companies of Uganda
Companies listed on the Uganda Securities Exchange